Group B of the 2011 Copa América was one of the three groups of competing nations in the 2011 Copa América. It comprised Brazil, Ecuador, Paraguay, and Venezuela. Group play ran from 3 to 13 July 2011.

Brazil won the group and faced Paraguay—the group's third-place finishers and the second-best third-place finishers in the first stage—again in the quarter-finals. Venezuela finished second and faced Chile, the winners of Group C. Ecuador finished fourth and were eliminated.

Standings

All times are in local, Argentina Time (UTC−03:00).

Brazil vs Venezuela

|valign="top"| 
|valign="top"|

Paraguay vs Ecuador

|valign="top"|

Brazil vs Paraguay

|valign="top"|

Venezuela vs Ecuador

|valign="top"|

Paraguay vs Venezuela

|valign="top"|

Brazil vs Ecuador

|valign="top"|

External links
Copa América 2011 Official Site

Group B
Group
2011 in Paraguayan football
2011 in Ecuadorian football
Group